CIBERSORT, also called CIBERSORTx, is a bioinformatics tool used to deconvolute cell type proportions and gene expression profiles from bulk RNA sequencing datasets. It is among the fastest growing software tools in the life sciences.

References 

Biotechnology